Rod Serling's Triple W: Witches, Warlocks and Werewolves is an anthology of fantasy and horror stories edited by Rod Serling and ghost edited by Gordon R. Dickson.  It was first published by Bantam Books in 1963.  Most of the stories originally appeared in the magazines Fantasy and Science Fiction, Unknown, New England Magazine, Fantastic, The Pioneer and Beyond Fantasy Fiction.

Contents

 Introduction, by Rod Serling
 "The Amulet", by Gordon R. Dickson
 "The Story of Sidi Nonman", Anonymous
 "The Final Ingredient", by Jack Sharkey
 "Blind Alley", by Malcolm Jameson
 "Young Goodman Brown", by Nathaniel Hawthorne
 "The Chestnut Beads", by Jane Roberts
 "Hatchery of Dreams", by Fritz Leiber
 "The Mark of the Beast", by Rudyard Kipling
 "And Not Quite Human", by Joe L. Hensley
 "Wolves Don’t Cry", by Bruce Elliott
 "The Black Retriever", by Charles G. Finney
 "Witch Trials and the Law", by Charles Mackay

Notes

References

1963 anthologies
Fantasy anthologies
Horror anthologies